The Dongshan River is a river in northeast Taiwan. It flows through Yilan County for 24 kilometers.

Facilities
The riverside is equipped with a bicycle path.

See also
 List of rivers in Taiwan
 National Center for Traditional Arts

References

Rivers of Taiwan
Landforms of Yilan County, Taiwan